Im Chang-kyun (born January 26, 1996), known by the stage name I.M or mononymously as Changkyun, is a South Korean rapper, singer, and songwriter. In 2015, he debuted in the South Korean boy group Monsta X, through the Mnet's survival show No.Mercy, under Starship Entertainment. He made his solo debut with the EP Duality in February 2021.

Career

Early life and debut 
He was born on January 26, 1996 in Suwon, Gyeonggi-do, South Korea and Gwangsan-gu, Gwangju as his hometown. He spent most of his early years living abroad due to his father's work as a scientist, including living in Boston, Massachusetts, where he then gained fluency in English, while his father worked at Harvard University.

In 2013 and 2014, I.M became part of the boy group Nu'bility under Special K Entertainment. The group never officially debuted despite holding several events and performances.

I.M was a late addition to Mnet's survival show No.Mercy, becoming the thirteenth competitor. Despite his late addition, he was one of the seven contestants chosen to debut in Starship Entertainment's new hip-hop boy group Monsta X.

2015–2020: Monsta X and solo work 
In May 2015, I.M debuted with Monsta X with their first EP Trespass, on which he has five writing credits.

In May 2016, I.M released his first mixtape through Starship Entertainment's YouTube channel, titled "Who Am I?" featuring Yeseo. 

On October 20, I.M released another mixtape titled "Madeleine" with Brother Su that featured J.Han.

In July 2017, I.M released a mixtape titled "Be My Friend", alongside group member Joohoney.

In February 2018, I.M released another solo mixtape titled "Fly With Me".

In April 2019, I.M released his mixtape, with the lead single "Horizon", which was a collaboration with the American artist ELHAE. He also released the song "Scent" as the B-side of the single.

In May 2020, I.M collaborated with ELHAE again, releasing the single "Need to Know". I.M also made his first solo appearance on the talk show Talk Talk Information Brunch.

2021–present: Duality and other solo endeavors 
In January 2021, I.M announced the solo work he had been preparing in 2020, would be released as his first solo album, with an intended release later in 2021. His first official release was announced to be an extended play titled Duality, which was released on February 19 with the lead single "God Damn". For his first EP, I.M was commended for showing a wider diversity of skill with the EP, with a noted difference in rap-style from his work in Monsta X as well as showcasing his abilities as singer-songwriter and composer. All five songs from the album charted on the weekly Billboard World Digital Song Sales chart, occupying twenty percent of the entire World Songs chart.

In July, I.M with other Monsta X members' Shownu and Hyungwon joined Pepsi's Taste of Korea summer campaign, releasing a promotional single "Summer Taste", alongside Rain, Brave Girls members' Yujeong and Yuna, and Ateez members' Hongjoong and Yunho.

In August, I.M was part of Baverse Studio's Welcome To My Baverse, which is a documentary where he can show his thoughts as a musician and as an idol group member. In September, I.M released the song "Loop" as part of his work for Welcome To My Baverse. He also contributed to the producing and composing of the song, as well as the production of the album cover image work. I.M also became a new DJ for Naver Now's radio program Midnight Idol, alongside group member Kihyun.

In August 2022, I.M decided not to renew his contract with Starship Entertainment but will still continue to participate in the group's future plans. 

In November, I.M signed an exclusive contract with Sony Music Korea for his solo activities.

Public image and impact 
I.M, as an individual and a member of Monsta X, showed outstanding musical growth that shined into a unique world of music. Also, his musical ability not only broke the prejudice of being an "idol", but became a musician that brings out genuine music. I.M has built his own identity through the release of various mixtapes, which showed off a different, yet original music color, and developed his skills through steady music work. In addition to music, he has also conducted exclusive interviews with famous overseas media, such as the Chicago Tribune and the BBC, with his fluent English skills, as well as playing an active role in leading the early overseas promotions of the group, becoming their practical spokesperson, as what Forbes had evaluated. I.M has established himself as an unprecedented artist who goes back and forth between groups and solos, while showing his outstanding musicality as an "all-round artist".

I.M dominates domestic and international charts with his solo releases, drawing hot global response, by topping on Melon, Bugs!, iTunes, Amazon, and Billboard, surpassing world-famous pop artists, including Ariana Grande, Moguai, Adele, and Coldplay, while occupying multiple spots on the charts, which is a rare feat, and one that only the biggest names in the business can muster.

Other ventures

Endorsements 
In June 2021, I.M became the new model for the Italian luxury fashion brand Versace's Eros Fragrance Perfume through the Korean fashion, beauty, and life magazine Singles. On July 14, he joined Pepsi's "Taste of Korea" summer campaign, along with Rain, Monsta X members' Shownu and Hyungwon, Brave Girls members' Yujeong and Yuna, and Ateez members' Hongjoong and Yunho.

Philanthropy 
In January 2022, I.M donated 00,000 through the idol fandom community service My Favorite Idol, for his birthday. It will be delivered to the Miral Welfare Foundation and used as a fund for the disabled who are isolated due to COVID-19.

Production 
In February 2019, I.M narrated an audiobook, Oscar Wilde's The Happy Prince, which was released through Naver's Audioclip. Later that year, he narrated two more audiobooks, Edgar Allan Poe's Annabelle Lee and William Wordsworth's My Heart Leaps Up, alongside group member Shownu, which were also released through Naver's Audioclip.

Discography

Extended plays

Singles

As lead artist

As featured artist

Promotional singles

Other charted songs

Mixtapes

Music videos

Filmography

TV appearances

Radio shows

Audiobook narrator

Songwriting

Awards and nominations

Notes

References

External links 
 

1996 births
Living people
People from Gwangju
People from Suwon
English-language singers from South Korea
Japanese-language singers of South Korea
K-pop singers
Starship Entertainment artists
South Korean hip hop record producers
South Korean male idols
South Korean male pop singers
South Korean male rappers
South Korean male singer-songwriters
South Korean singer-songwriters
Monsta X members
Weekly Idol members